Jean-Pierre Lacroix may refer to:

 Jean-Pierre Lacroix (civil servant), French civil servant
 Jean-Pierre Lacroix (diplomat), French diplomat
 Jean-Pierre Lacroix (entomologist), French entomologist